Easebourne Priory was a priory in Easebourne, West Sussex, England.

The Nativity of the Blessed Virgin Mary was built as an Augustinian nunnery for a prioress and ten nuns. It was founded before 1238 by the de Bohun family of St. Ann's Hill in nearby Midhurst, probably by John de Bohun who fought at Crecy.

It may have been refounded in the 15th century and became Benedictine.

In 1536, following the Dissolution of the Monasteries, Easebourne Priory was granted to William FitzWilliam, 1st Earl of Southampton, along with other properties,

Claustral remains are now incorporated into a Grade I listed house built on the south side of St Mary's church. The restored refectory is now in parochial use.

Elizabeth I at Easebourne
Elizabeth I of England came to the Priory on 17 August 1591 from Cowdray House, as the guest of Anthony Browne, 1st Viscount Montagu, "where my lord himselfe kept house", and left on 20 August. An actor playing the part of a pilgrim led her to an oak tree where the heraldry of all the county was displayed, and a "wild man" dressed in ivy explained their loyalty to her. The next day, at a fishpond an actor dressed as an angler spoke with a "fisherman", then addressed the queen on the subject of loyalty   The speeches and entertainments were printed later in the year.

References

Grade I listed buildings in West Sussex
Monasteries in West Sussex